Transport in Jersey is primarily through the motor vehicle. The island, which is the largest of the Channel Islands has 124,737 registered vehicles (2016). The island is committed to combatting climate change, having declared a climate emergency, and policy is focused on reducing dependence on the car. The island has a cycle network and bus service. The primary modes of transport for leaving the island are by air or sea.

Road transport
Road transport is the primary form of both private and public transport in Jersey.

Highways 

Vehicles in Jersey drive on the left side of the road. The island has a default speed limit of 40 miles per hour (64 km/h) with slower limits on certain stretches of road, such as 20/30 mph (32/48 km/h) in built up areas and 15 mph (24 km/h) on roads designated as green lanes.

The island is home to longest dual carriageway in the Channel Islands, consisting of Victoria Avenue (A2), and the Esplanade/Route de la Liberation (A1). Roads in Jersey are often named in French or Jèrriais, except in St Helier, where they are often named in English.

Public highways are state-owned and managed by public highways authorities. Main roads are maintained by the Government of Jersey and funded through general taxation. By-roads (chemins vinciaux) are managed by the relevant parish through a Roads Committee. Roads Inspectors are elected to report on roads in their vingtaine.

Roads in Jersey are classified using two systems. The first is the signposted system for classifying main roads, consisting of an "A", "B" and "C" system as used in Great Britain, Northern Ireland and the Isle of Man. These are often signed on directional signs, however some are inaccurate.

The second is a system used privately by the Government of Jersey to classify both main roads and by-roads. The system consists of Class 1, 2 and 3 roads (main roads) and Class 4 roads (by-roads). Class 1 roads include Victoria Avenue.

A Visite du Branchage is an inspection of roads to ensure property owners have complied with the laws against vegetation encroaching on the highway.

History 
Until the 19th century, Jersey's highway system were narrow and muddy tracks connecting homes and fields to the churches, mills and beaches. Around the turn of the 18th century, the number of roads are described as "[holding] no Proportion with the Bigness [of the island]". The sides of the road, unlike in England had "great Bulwarks of Earth ... from 6 to 8, and sometimes 10 Foot high".

In the early 19th century, the military roads were constructed (on occasion at gunpoint in the face of opposition from landowners) by the governor, General George Don, to link coastal fortifications with St. Helier harbour. These had an unexpected effect on agriculture once peace restored reliable trade links. Farmers in previously isolated valleys were able to swiftly transport crops grown in the island's microclimate to waiting ships and then on to the markets of London and Paris ahead of the competition. In conjunction with the later introduction of steamships and the development of the French and British railway systems, Jersey's agriculture was no longer as isolated as before.

A-roads 

 A1 St Helier to St Aubin road: La Route de la Liberation, Esplanade, La Route de Saint Aubin, La Route de la Haule
 A2 St Helier to Bel Royal road: Victoria Avenue
 A3 St Helier to Gorey road: Don Road, Georgetown Road, Bagot Road, Longueville Road, La Rue à Don
 A4 St Clement to Gorey coast road
 A5 St Clement to Gorey inner road
 A6 St Helier to St Martin road: Mont Millais, Bagatelle Road, La Grande Route de Saint Martin
 A7 St Helier to St Saviour road: La Motte Street, St Saviour's Road, St Saviour's Hill
 A8 St Helier to Trinity road: Trinity Road, Le Mont de la Trinité, La Route de la Trinité, La Rue des Croix, La Route d'Ebenezer
 A9 St Helier to St John road: Queens Road, La Grande Route de Saint Jean, La Route des Issues
 A10 St Lawrence main road: La Grande Route de Saint Laurent
 A11 St Peter's valley road: La Vallée de Saint Pierre
 A12 Beaumont to St Ouen road: La Route de Beaumont, La Grande Route de Saint Pierre, La Grande Route de Saint Ouen
 A13 St Aubin to Red Houses road: La Mont les Vaux, La Grande Route de Saint Brelade, La Route des Genets, La Route Orange
 A14: Rouge Bouillon
 A15: St Clement's Road
 A16: Commercial Buildings
 A17: La Route du Fort

Driving laws 

Driving laws in Jersey are the United Kingdom Highway Code, supplemented by the Jersey Highway Code.

Visitors wishing to drive must possess a Certificate of Insurance or an International Green Card, a valid Driving Licence or International Driving Permit (UK International Driving Permits are not valid). Photocopies are not acceptable. A nationality plate must be displayed on the back of visiting vehicles.

It is an offence to hold a mobile phone whilst driving a moving vehicle. It is not an offence to use a hands-free system. Where fitted, all passengers inside a vehicle must wear a seat belt at all times, regardless of whether they are sitting in the front or the rear.

Drink-driving is illegal in Jersey. Police use breathalyser tests during spot checks and a person is guilty if there is over 35 microgrammes of alcohol per 100 ml breath.

The penalties for drinking and driving in Jersey are up to £2,000 fine or 6 months in prison for the first offence plus unlimited disqualification of driving licence. It is an offence to drive whilst under the influence of drugs. Since July 2014 it has also been illegal to smoke in any vehicle carrying passengers under the age of 18.

Traffic calming 
Over the years, a number of traffic calming schemes have been introduced around the island to get motorists to slow down. In 2016, a report in the JEP outlined a number of traffic calming schemes that were under consideration around the island.

Car sharing 
Jersey has a shared electric car operator, EVie, that provides islandwide self-service electric car hire.

Cycling 

Jersey has infrastructure dedicated to cyclists. Cycle infrastructure has been improving in the previous decade under the Sustainable Transport Policy.

The best developed cycle route is the route from St Helier to Corbière. The route consists of segregated cycle paths and shared pedestrian-cycle paths, including the St Aubin's Bay promenade and the Railway Walk. The connection from West Park to Havre des Pas was completed an upgraded after a ministerial decision in 2011. A branch of this route connects to St Peter's Village via Les Quennevais.

There is a segregated cycle-pedestrian path along St Peter's Valley, which connects pedestrians and cyclists from the green lane network in St Mary to roads near the St Aubin's Bay Promenade cycle route. It was opened in 2016.

Jersey has a network of signposted cycle routes. There are fifteen routes in total, such as route 1, which forms a loop around the island. Most of the routes are on quieter lanes and dedicated paths, however some of these routes are on busy main road with no dedicated infrastructure.

The Eastern Cycle Route network is a proposed network of cycle-safe routes in the eastern parishes of St Clement and Grouville. The first section from Gorey to La Ville-ès-Renauds in Grouville was opened in 2011.

There is a dedicated network of Green Lanes across the island, which have a 15 mph speed limit and where priority is afforded to cyclists.

Jersey has a shared electric bike operator, EVie, that provides islandwide self-service electric bike hire.

Companies 
EVie

Buses 

Buses started running on the island in the 1920s, and by the 1930s, competition from motor buses had rendered the railways unprofitable, with final closure coming in 1935 after a fire disaster (except for the later German reintroduction of rail during the military occupation).

Buses are operated by CT Plus Jersey, a local subsidiary of HCT Group. Bus service routes radiate from the Liberation Station in St Helier.

In 2012, it was announced that CT Plus would take over the operation of the bus service, commencing on 2 January 2013, ending 10 years of Connex service in Jersey. This new service is called LibertyBus.

Parking

Public parking in Jersey is controlled by time restrictions and payment.

A single-yellow line along the side of the carriageway indicates a "No waiting" restriction. There are no double-yellow lines in Jersey. Parking on yellow lines is liable to a fine.

Some on-street and off-street parking is paid parking. Payments operate using either Paycards or PayByPhone and is indicated with the Paycard Symbol. Paycards are a form of voucher payment. Paycards are purchased from various stores around the island and can be used by scratching the time of arrival on the relevant number of units.

Certain car parks, such as the Waterfront, Sand Street and Ports of Jersey Car Parks use automatic number plate recognition or ticket technology with a pay upon exit system.

Some parking is free to use however is time-restricted and a Jersey parking disc must be displayed showing time of arrival.

There are four main residents’ and business parking zones within St Helier.

Air transport
There is a single airport on the island, Jersey Airport, located in St Peter. It has one runway and one terminal building and has direct flights throughout the year to many United Kingdom and International destinations, including nine daily flights to London.

Before the present airport opened in 1937, air transport was through seaplanes, which landed at West Park in St Helier. The first aeroplane to land in Jersey was the Sanchez Besa in August 1912. The first passenger flight was recorded as taking place 147 years earlier through air balloon.

Rail transport

Historically there were public railway services in the island, provided by two railway companies:
The Jersey Railway (closed in 1936)
The Jersey Eastern Railway (closed in 1929).

The mostly coastal lines operated out of St Helier and ran across the southern part of the island, reaching Gorey Harbour in the east and la Corbière in the west.

After closure, most of the infrastructure was removed and today little evidence remains of these railways. A small number of former station buildings are still standing, including St Helier Weighbridge, which is now in use as the Liberty Wharf shopping centre, and St Aubin railway station, which is used today as the Parish Hall of Saint Brélade. Part of the former Jersey Railway line from St Aubin to Corbière has been converted into a rail trail for cyclists and walkers.

During the German military occupation 1940–1945, light railways were re-established by the Germans for the purpose of supplying coastal fortifications. A one-metre gauge line was laid down following the route of the former Jersey Railway from Saint Helier to La Corbière, with a branch line connecting the stone quarry at Ronez in Saint John. A 60 cm line ran along the west coast, and another was laid out heading east from Saint Helier to Gorey. The first line was opened in July 1942, the ceremony being disrupted by passively resisting Jersey spectators. The German railway infrastructure was dismantled after the Liberation in 1945.

Two railways operate at the Pallot Heritage Steam Museum; a standard gauge heritage steam railway, and a narrow gauge pleasure line operated by steam-outline diesel motive power.

Sea transport

History 
An important growth for St Helier in the early 19th century was the construction of the harbour. Previously, ships coming into the town had only a small jetty at the site now called the English Harbour and the French Harbour. The Chamber of Commerce urged the States to build a new harbour, but the States refused, so the Chamber took it into their own hands and repaired and upgraded the harbour in 1790. A new breakwater was constructed to shelter the jetty and harbours. In 1814, the merchants constructed the roads now known as Commercial Buildings and Le Quai des Marchands to connect the harbours to the town and in 1832 construction was finished on the Esplanade and its sea wall. A rapid expansion in shipping led the States in 1837 to order the construction of two new piers: the Victoria and Albert Piers.

Seaports and harbours 
Saint Helier is the island's main port, others include Gorey, Saint Aubin, La Rocque, and Bonne Nuit.

On 20 August 2013, Huelin-Renouf, which had operated a "lift-on lift-off" container service for 80 years between the Port of Southampton and the Port of Jersey, ceased trading.  Senator Alan Maclean, a Jersey politician had previously tried to save the 90-odd jobs furnished by the company to no avail. On 20 September, it was announced that Channel Island Lines would continue this service, and would purchase the MV Huelin Dispatch from Associated British Ports who in turn had purchased them from the receiver in the bankruptcy. The new operator was to be funded by Rockayne Limited, a closely held association of Jersey businesspeople. Channel Island Lines closed in 2020.

Passenger-only access to France is provided by Manche-Iles Express ferry service, to either Barneville-Carteret, Granville or Dielette.

A service to St Malo was provided by Compagnie Corsaire, but is now operated by its sister service, Condor Ferries, which runs MV Commodore Goodwill, a large ro-ro vessel to Portsmouth, and has multiple ro-ro connections to Poole and St Malo.

Poole - Guernsey - Jersey (seasonal service normally operated by Condor Liberation)
Portsmouth - Guernsey - Jersey (Commodore Clipper, Commodore Goodwill. Commodore Goodwill service is extended to St Malo at the weekends)
Saint-Malo - Jersey - Guernsey (Condor Rapide)

Companies
Condor Ferries freight and passenger services: Commodore Goodwill.
Manche Îles Express

See also

 Bailiwick of Jersey
 List of shipwrecks in the Channel Islands

References

External links
Jersey on SABRE Road Wiki

 
Ports and harbours of Jersey
.Jersey
Jersey